Federal Route 59, or Jalan Tapah–Cameron Highlands, is a 90 km federal road in Perak and Pahang state, Malaysia. It was the main route to Cameron Highlands, Pahang from Tapah, Perak, before the second route Second East–West Highway was built in 2001.

Route background
The Kilometre Zero of the Federal Route 59 is located at Tapah, Perak, at its interchange with the Federal Route 1, the main trunk road of the centre of Peninsular Malaysia.  The Kilometre Zero monument is erected near Pos Malaysia post office at Jalan Stesen, Tapah.

History
The Cameron Highlands were explored in 1885 by William Cameron, a British surveyor. The trail used by Cameron remained unchanged until the 1920s when the British colonial Federated Malay States (FMS) government upgrades from trail road to a two-lane road.

Along the road, there are many scenic views and tourist attractions. Due to the increase in the number of tourists to Cameron Highlands in recent years and with virtually no upgrades to the existing road, traffic congestion occurs daily, sometimes up to 5 hours, particularly from Tanah Rata to Kea Farm. A large reason for the increase in traffic congestion can be attributed to the relatively single lane narrow road leading to the Sungei Palas BOH Tea Factory and Tea Garden, where cars have to adopt a stop-and-go method to avoid collisions.

Features
 Narrow roads (JKR R3 (mountainous)) standard for the most section with a maximum speed limit of 40 km/h)
 Kuala Woh waterfall
 Orang Asli villages
 Kuala Woh and Lata Iskandar waterfalls
 A daily day-night market at Brinchang town and Kea Farm but has been moved to Golden Hills and operates during the weekends only
 Connects to Federal Route 432 Jalan Gunung Brinchang, the highest paved road in Malaysia.
 Tapah Interchange, a major interchange of the North–South Expressway Northern Route

At most sections, the Federal Route 59 was built under the JKR R5 road standard, allowing maximum speed limit of up to 90 km/h.

Upgrading from Tapah to Cameron Highlands
A multi-million ringgit project to widen and upgrade the road from Tapah to the highlands has been proposed. Motorists prefer to use the road from Simpang Pulai in Ipoh rather than the winding road up from Tapah. The 40 km stretch from Kampung Pahang here is regularly used by lorries carrying vegetables from the highlands to the rest of the country and Singapore. During peak days, the road is heavily congested. Motorists dread driving along the road, especially during the rainy season, as it is landslide-prone.

List of junctions and towns

References

Malaysian Federal Roads